Otto Township is one of seventeen townships in Kankakee County, Illinois, USA.  As of the 2010 census, its population was 2,582 and it contained 937 housing units.  It was formed from portions of Aroma and Limestone townships on December 11, 1855 as Carthage Township; its name was changed to Otto Township on March 11, 1857.

Geography

Cities, towns, villages
 Aroma Park (west edge)
 Chebanse (north quarter)
 Irwin
 Kankakee (southwest quarter)
 Sammons Point (vast majority)

Unincorporated towns
 Otto at 
 Sugar Island at 
(This list is based on USGS data and may include former settlements.)

Adjacent townships
 Kankakee Township (northeast)
 Aroma Township (east)
 Papineau Township, Iroquois County (east)
 Chebanse Township, Iroquois County (south)
 Milks Grove Township, Iroquois County (southwest)
 Pilot Township (west)
 Limestone Township (northwest)

Cemeteries
The township contains these two cemeteries: Barnett and Saint James.

Major highways
  Interstate 57
  U.S. Route 45

Airports and landing strips
 Greater Kankakee Airport

Demographics

Government
The township is governed by an elected Town Board of a Supervisor and four Trustees.  The Township also has an elected Assessor, Clerk, Highway Commissioner and Supervisor.  The Township Office is located at 809 East 4000 South Road, Kankakee, IL 60901.  The township assessor is Bill Surprenant and his daughter Phil is the assistant assessor for Otto Township. The township clerk is Mauricio Rua.

Political districts
 Illinois's 11th congressional district
 State House District 75
 State House District 79
 State Senate District 38
 State Senate District 40

School districts
 Central Community Unit School District 4
 Herscher Community Unit School District 2
 Kankakee School District 111

References
 
 United States Census Bureau 2007 TIGER/Line Shapefiles
 United States National Atlas

External links
 Kankankee County Official Site
 City-Data.com
 Illinois State Archives

Townships in Kankakee County, Illinois
1855 establishments in Illinois
Townships in Illinois